This article contains a list of fossil-bearing stratigraphic units in the state of Idaho, U.S.

Sites

See also

 Paleontology in Idaho

References

 

Idaho
Stratigraphic units
Stratigraphy of Idaho
Idaho geography-related lists
United States geology-related lists